Zabrus flavangulus is a species of ground beetle in the Iberozabrus subgenus that can be found in Portugal and Spain.

References

Beetles described in 1840
Beetles of Europe
Zabrus